Christopher Philip James Elmore (born 23 December 1983) is a Welsh Labour Party politician. He has been Member of Parliament (MP) for Ogmore since 2016.

Early life and career
Elmore was born in Newport and lived in Brynmawr and in Caerphilly as a child.

He started his working life as a trainee butcher and later attended Cardiff Metropolitan University completing a degree in History and Culture in 2005. Elmore then worked in a number of professions including further education.

In 2008, Elmore was elected as a councillor for Casteland in the Vale of Glamorgan Council. Later he was appointed as a cabinet member for children's services and schools.

Parliamentary career
Elmore unsuccessfully contested the seat of Vale of Glamorgan in the 2015 United Kingdom general election before being selected as the Labour candidate in the 2016 Ogmore by-election, which was held on 5 May 2016.

In June 2016, Elmore was joined the Justice Select Committee before also joining the Welsh Affairs Select Committee in July. In October 2016, he was appointed to the frontbench position of Opposition whip.

He supported Owen Smith in the failed attempt to replace Jeremy Corbyn in the 2016 Labour Party leadership election.

Since his election as an MP, Elmore has particularly focused on issues that impact young people, often speaking in parliament and elsewhere on the subject. Youth engagement is an issue on which Elmore previously campaigned as a councillor.

In 2017, Elmore was elected as Chair of the All-Party Parliamentary Group on Rail in Wales. He has been a vocal opponent of the government's 2017 decision to cancel the planned electrification of the Great Western Mainline between Cardiff and Swansea. He has campaigned on issues including passenger safety.

In April 2020, Elmore was made Shadow Minister for Scotland by new leader Keir Starmer. In this role he supported Ian Murray, Shadow Secretary of State for Scotland. He was also made a senior Opposition whip as a Shadow Lord Commissioner of HM Household.

References

External links

1983 births
Living people
Alumni of Cardiff Metropolitan University
Welsh Labour Party MPs
Place of birth missing (living people)
UK MPs 2015–2017
UK MPs 2017–2019
UK MPs 2019–present
Welsh Labour councillors
People from Newport, Wales